Gilbert Riswold (1882–1938) was an American sculptor.

Early life
Gilbert Riswold was born in 1882 in Minnehaha County, South Dakota, not far from Baltic. He graduated from South Dakota State University, and attended the School of the Art Institute of Chicago.

Career
Riswold began his career as a sculptor in Chicago. He designed the statue of Stephen A. Douglas on the grounds of the Illinois State Capitol in Springfield, Illinois. He also designed a monument in Scoville Park in Oak Park, Illinois.

Riswold moved to Utah in 1926 to design the Mormon Battalion Monument on the grounds of the Utah State Capitol in Salt Lake City, Utah. By the 1930s, he worked as a sculptor in Los Angeles, California. He also designed sculptures in his home state of South Dakota.

Death
Riswold died in 1938 in Los Angeles.

See also
 Bust of Charles Roscoe Savage

References

1882 births
1938 deaths
People from Minnehaha County, South Dakota
South Dakota State University alumni
Artists from South Dakota
Artists from Los Angeles
Sculptors from California
20th-century American sculptors
20th-century American male artists